The Adler Ski Stadium is a ski jumping complex in Hinterzarten, Germany.

History
It was opened in 1924 and owned by SC Hinterzarten. It hosted four FIS Ski jumping World Cup events for ladies. This jump was the first and now the regular host of Summer Grand Prix. Noriaki Kasai holds the hill record.

The first ever women's World Cup team competition was held here on 16 December 2017. The Japanese team won the ski jump. The team were Kaori Iwabuchi, Sara Takanashi, Yuka Seto and Yuki Ito.

Other jumps
Energiedienst-Schanze: K-15
Schülerschanze: K-30
Europa-Park-Schanze: K-70

References

Ski jumping venues in Germany
Sports venues in Baden-Württemberg
Sports venues completed in 1924
1924 establishments in Germany